The Disabled-1 (Dab1) gene encodes a key regulator of Reelin signaling. Reelin is a large glycoprotein secreted by neurons of the developing brain, particularly Cajal-Retzius cells. DAB1 functions downstream of Reln in a signaling pathway
that controls cell positioning in the developing brain and during adult neurogenesis. It docks to the intracellular part of the Reelin very low density lipoprotein receptor (VLDLR) and apoE receptor type 2 (ApoER2) and becomes tyrosine-phosphorylated following binding of Reelin to cortical neurons. In mice, mutations of Dab1 and Reelin generate identical phenotypes. In humans, Reelin mutations are associated with brain malformations and mental retardation. In mice, Dab1 mutation results in the scrambler mouse phenotype.

With a genomic length of 1.1 Mbp for a coding region of 5.5 kb, DAB1 provides a rare example of genomic complexity, which will impede the identification of human mutations.

Gene function 
Cortical neurons form in specialized proliferative regions deep in the brain and migrate past previously formed neurons to reach their proper layer. The laminar organization of multiple neuronal types in the cerebral cortex is required for normal cognitive function. The mouse 'reeler' mutation causes abnormal patterns of cortical neuronal migration as well as additional defects in cerebellar development and neuronal positioning in other brain regions. Reelin (RELN; 600514), the reeler gene product, is an extracellular protein secreted by pioneer neurons. The mouse 'scrambler' and 'yotari' recessive mutations exhibit a phenotype identical to that of reeler. Ware et al. (1997) determined that the scrambler phenotype arises from mutations in Dab1, a mouse gene related to the Drosophila gene 'disabled' (dab). Disabled-1 (Dab1) is an adaptor protein that is essential for the intracellular transduction of Reelin signaling, which regulates the migration and differentiation of postmitotic neurons during brain development in vertebrates. Dab1 function depends on its tyrosine phosphorylation by Src family kinases, especially Fyn. Dab encodes a phosphoprotein that binds nonreceptor tyrosine kinases and that has been implicated in neuronal development in flies. Sheldon et al. (1997) found that the yotari phenotype also results from a mutation in the Dab1 gene. Using in situ hybridization to embryonic day-13.5 mouse brain tissue, they demonstrated that Dab1 is expressed in neuronal populations exposed to reelin. The authors concluded that reelin and Dab1 function as signaling molecules that regulate cell positioning in the developing brain. Howell et al. (1997) showed that targeted disruption of the Dab1 gene disturbed neuronal layering in the cerebral cortex, hippocampus, and cerebellum, causing a reeler-like phenotype.

Layering of neurons in the cerebral cortex and cerebellum requires RELN and DAB1. By targeted disruption experiments in mice, Trommsdorff et al. (1999) showed that 2 cell surface receptors, very low density lipoprotein receptor (VLDLR; 192977) and apolipoprotein E receptor-2 (ApoER2; 602600), are also required. Both receptors bound Dab1 on their cytoplasmic tails and were expressed in cortical and cerebellar layers adjacent to layers expressing Reln. Dab1 expression was upregulated in knockout mice lacking both the Vldlr and Apoer2 genes. Inversion of cortical layers, absence of cerebellar foliation, and the migration of Purkinje cells in these animals precisely mimicked the phenotype of mice lacking Reln or Dab1. These findings established novel signaling functions for the LDL receptor gene family and suggested that VLDLR and APOER2 participate in transmitting the extracellular RELN signal to intracellular signaling processes initiated by DAB1.

In the reeler mouse, the telencephalic neurons (which are misplaced following migration) express approximately 10-fold more DAB1 than their wildtype counterpart. Such an increase in the expression of a protein that virtually functions as a receptor is expected to occur when the specific signal for the receptor is missing.

Pathology 
Mutations of the DAB1 gene can cause spinocerebellar ataxia type 37. The fact that mutations of the DAB1 gene are also linked to Alzheimer's disease (AD) has been explained by the hypothetic role of reelin signaling in AD.

Gene variants and associated phenotypes in humans 

In a study by Dr. Scott Williamson of Cornell University, a newer version of the DAB1 gene had been shown to be universal among those of Chinese ancestry, but not found among other global populations.

References

Further reading

External links 
 Reelin Signaling Pathway - DAB1 plays a major role in the Reelin pathway; malfunctions at this pathway are linked to schizophrenia, autism, lissencephaly and other brain diseases.
 

Peripheral membrane proteins
Phosphoproteins
Developmental neuroscience